TIA/EIA standard IS-641 is a speech coding standard used in some computer and telecommunications networks in the U.S.A. The main usage was in the U.S. TDMA networks defined by IS-136. The bit rate of the speech codec is 7.4 kbit/s. This codec is the same as the 7.4 kbit/s mode in the AMR speech codec. The standard has been superseded by TIA/EIA-136-410.

Speech codecs
Mobile telecommunications standards